Richard Neal (born March 11,1940) served as Police Commissioner of Philadelphia, Pennsylvania from 1992 to 1998.

Biography

After serving 36 years on the Philadelphia police force (including six years as Commissioner), Neal resigned under political pressure. He was replaced by John Timoney, former first deputy commissioner in New York City. Neal was subsequently hired as a security consultant by Drexel University and the Penn's Landing Corporation, a Philadelphia development group.

References

1940 births
Living people
Commissioners of the Philadelphia Police Department
Philadelphia Police Department officers